28 Aurigae (28 Aur) is a star in the constellation Auriga. Its apparent magnitude is 6.80. It is a giant star which has exhausted its core hydrogen and expanded to ten times the size of the Sun. Despite being slightly cooler than the sun at  it is 73 times more luminous.

28 Aurigae is one of the few faint Flamsteed stars which is not in the Bright Star Catalogue.  It is included in the Hipparcos catalogue and its parallax was calculated to be .  Its Gaia Data Release 2 parallax is very similar, but more precise at

References

Auriga (constellation)
G-type subgiants
Aurigae, 28
Durchmusterung objects
038604
027458
G-type giants